Sandra Ng Kwan-yue (born 2 August 1965) is a Hong Kong actress, film director and producer.

Life and career
The daughter of the actor Kenneth Ng Kam Tsun, Ng was born in Hong Kong, where she attended St. Stephen's Girls' College. Encouraged by her parents, she began her entertainment career at the age of 16. She is most known through her comic roles, where she often pokes fun at her plain looks. She has frequently collaborated with Stephen Chow, notably in All for the Winner, Magnificent Scoundrels and Royal Tramp, among others. In a career spanning over 20 years, she has filmed over 100 films and TV shows. She co-hosted Club Sparkle (星星同學會), a celebrity talk show, during the first half of 2009 and is also a radio personality for CRHK. Her radio program, He She Hit (她他她打到嚟！), aired from 12am to 2am on Monday to Friday.

She received the Best Actress Award at the 2003 Golden Horse Awards for her role as a prostitute in Golden Chicken. In 1996, she dated the film director Peter Chan. Later in 2006, they had a daughter named Jilian.

Filmography

1980s

1990s

2000s

2010s

2020s

Hosting

Music video appearances

Discography

Studio albums

Extended plays

Singles

Awards and nominations

References

External links

1962 births
Living people
20th-century Hong Kong actresses
20th-century Hong Kong women singers
21st-century Hong Kong actresses
Hong Kong film actresses
Hong Kong film directors
Hong Kong film producers
Hong Kong radio presenters
Hong Kong women radio presenters
Hong Kong television actresses
Hong Kong television presenters
Hong Kong women television presenters
Hong Kong women comedians